Felipe de Jesús Quintero Monsivais (born July 29, 1979, in Monterrey), known as Felipe Quintero, is a Mexican soccer player currently playing for Atlanta Silverbacks in the North American Soccer League.

Career

Mexico
Quintero was in Club Deportivo Guadalajara's youth system from 1999 to 2004. In 2005, he played for Lobos de la BUAP in the Primera División A which is the second division in Mexico. Quintero also helped Irapuato win the Mexican second division title and advance to the first division. He also played for Ángeles de Puebla, Ciudad Juárez, and Querétaro.

United States
Quintero signed with the Atlanta Silverbacks of the USL First Division in 2006, and was the team's first choice goalkeeper for the next two seasons until the Silverbacks went on hiatus following the conclusion of the 2009 USL1 season.

He re-signed with the club, now in the North American Soccer League, on March 11, 2011.

International
In 1999, he was a member of the Mexico Under-20 national team.

Personal
He is also the grandson of Francisco Quintero Nava, former Mexican goalkeeper with Club Deportivo Guadalajara (Chivas), who played alongside Antonio Carbajal at the 1948 Olympics in London.

Notes

References

External links
 
 
 
 

1979 births
Living people
Irapuato F.C. footballers
Atlanta Silverbacks players
USL First Division players
Footballers from Nuevo León
North American Soccer League players
Expatriate soccer players in the United States
Sportspeople from Monterrey
Association football goalkeepers
Mexican footballers